The Roman Catholic Diocese of Campo Maior is a Latin suffragan diocese in the Ecclesiastical province of Teresina, in northeastern Brazil's Piauí state.

Its cathedral episcopal see is Catedral Santo Antônio, dedicated to Saint Anthony, in the city of Campo Maior, Piauí.

History 
 Established 12 June 1975 as Diocese of Campo Maior on territories split off from the Diocese of Parnaíba and its Metropolitan Archdiocese of Teresina

Statistics 
As per 2014, it pastorally served 354,000 Catholics (94.9% of 373,000 total) on 27,943 km² in 31 parishes and 419 missions with 35 priests (34 diocesan, 1 religious), 1 deacon, 23 lay religious (1 brother, 22 sisters) and 10 seminarians.

Bishops
(all Roman rite)

Episcopal ordinaries
Suffragan Bishops of Campo Maior 
 Abel Alonso Núñez, Mercederians (O. de M.) (1976.03.24 – retired 2000.02.02), previously Auxiliary Bishop of the then Territorial Prelature of Bom Jesus do Piauí (Brazil) (1971.07.14 – 1976.03.24) & Titular Bishop of Nicives (1971.07.14 – 1976.03.24)
 Eduardo Zielski (2000.02.02 – 2016.03.02), next Bishop of São Raimundo Nonato, Piaui (2016.03.02 - present)
 Francisco de Assis Gabriel dos Santos, Redemptorists (C.SS.R.) (2017.06.21 – ...), no previous prelature.

So far, the diocese has had no auxiliary bishop.

Other priest of this diocese who became bishop
Juarez Sousa Da Silva, appointed Bishop of Oeiras, Piaui in 2008

See also 
 List of Catholic dioceses in Brazil

Sources and external links
 GCatholic.org, with Google map - data for all sections
 Catholic Hierarchy

Roman Catholic dioceses in Brazil
Religious organizations established in 1975
Roman Catholic Ecclesiastical Province of Teresina
Roman Catholic dioceses and prelatures established in the 20th century